The 2019 Piala Sumbangsih was the 34th edition of the Piala Sumbangsih, an annual football match played between the winners of the previous season's Malaysia Super League and Malaysia Cup. The game was played between the Johor Darul Ta'zim F.C., champions of the 2018 Malaysia Super League, and Perak, winners of the 2018 Malaysia Cup.

Match details

Source:

Winners

References 

Piala Sumbangsih seasons
2019 in Malaysian football